Cannes station or Cannes-Voyageurs (French: Gare de Cannes) is the main railway station for the French Southern city of Cannes. It is situated on the Marseille–Ventimiglia railway.

History

The station opened on 10 April 1863 when the line from Marseille to Cagnes-sur-Mer opened to passengers. The station was a small elegant building with a rooftop spanning both tracks of the main line. In 1870 the line from Grasse is opened. The engine depot was moved to La Bocca in 1880 and a goods station opened in 1883. With the lengthening of trains, the old station proved to be too small for the growing town. Work on a new station started in 1962. The station building was subsequently replaced by the present structure in 1975. The line is still outdoors but projects exist to bury the line, as at Monaco.

Train services
The station is served by the following services:

High speed services (TGV) Paris - Avignon - Aix-en-Provence - Cannes - Antibes - Nice
High speed services (TGV) Bruxelles-Midi - Lille-Europe - Airport Charles de Gaulle - Lyon - Avignon - Aix-en-Provence - Marseille - Cannes - Nice
High speed services (TGV) Nancy - Strasbourg - Besançon - Dijon - Lyon - Avignon - Marseille - Cannes - Nice
High speed services (TGV) Lyon - Marseille - Nice
Regional services (TER Provence-Alpes-Côte-d'Azur) Marseille - Toulon - Les Arcs–Draguignan - Cannes - Nice
Local services (TER Provence-Alpes-Côte-d'Azur) Les Arcs–Draguignan - Cannes - Nice
Local services (TER Provence-Alpes-Côte-d'Azur) Grasse/Mandelieu - Cannes - Nice - Monaco - Ventimiglia

See also
Cannes-la-Bocca
Cannes-Le Bosquet
Cannes-Ranguin

References

External links
 
 
Gare SNCF de: "Cannes"

Gare
Railway stations in Alpes-Maritimes
Railway stations in France opened in 1863
TER Provence-Alpes-Côte-d'Azur